Zbigniew Zieliński (born 14 January 1965) is a Polish prelate of the Catholic Church who became the bishop of the Diocese of Koszalin-Kołobrzeg in February 2023. He was bishop coadjutor of the Diocese of Koszalin-Kołobrzeg from March 2022 to February 2023. He was auxiliary bishop of the Archdiocese of Gdańsk from 2015 to 2022.

Biography
Zbigniew Jan Zieliński was born on 14 January 1965 in Gdańsk. He studied at the major seminary of Gdańsk and on 18 May 1991 was ordained a priest of that archdiocese. In 1995 he continued his studies at the Academy of Catholic Theology in Warsaw, now Cardinal Stefan Wyszyński University, earning a doctorate in sociology in 2004.

From 1991 to 1999 he was Vicar in the Parish of B.V.M. Addolorata in Gdańsk and from 1999 to 2000 in the Cathedral of the Most Holy Trinity in the Oliwa section of Gdańsk. From 2000 to 2008 he was director of the Department for Pastoral Care of the archdiocese. From 2004 to 2006 he was a professor of the sociology of religion at the University of Gdańsk. From 2004 to 2007 he was pastor of the parish of St. Michael the Archangel in Sopot and from 2007 to 2014 of the Cathedral in Oliwa. In 2014-2015, he was parish priest of the Co-Cathedral of the Assumption of the Blessed Virgin Mary in Gdańsk.

On 26 September 2015 he was appointed titular bishop of Medeli and auxiliary of the archdiocese of Gdańsk. He received his episcopal consecration from Tadeusz Gocłowski, Archbishop of Gdańsk, on 24 October. 

In the Polish Bishops' Conference, he is a member of the Council for Social Affairs.

On 10 March 2022, Pope Francis named him bishop coadjutor of the Diocese of Koszalin-Kołobrzeg.

References

External links
 

Living people
1965 births
Bishops of Gdańsk 
Bishops appointed by Pope Francis